David Cassels (4 March 1859 – 25 January 1923) was a Scotland international rugby union player. He was the 35th President of the Scottish Rugby Union.

Rugby Union career

Amateur career

Cassels played rugby union for West of Scotland.

Provincial career

Cassels played for Glasgow District in the inter-city match of 1879 and 1880. He captained the side in 1881.

He was capped by West District in January 1880. In February 1881, he was capped by West of Scotland District for their match against East of Scotland District.

International career

Cassels had 7 caps for Scotland between 1880 and 1883.

Administrative career

Cassels became the 35th President of the Scottish Rugby Union. He served one year from 1908 to 1909.

References

1859 births
1923 deaths
Rugby union players from Glasgow
Scottish rugby union players
Rugby union forwards
Scotland international rugby union players
Presidents of the Scottish Rugby Union
West of Scotland FC players
Glasgow District (rugby union) players
West of Scotland District (rugby union) players